Navod Ilukwatta (born 21 December 1991) is a Sri Lankan cricketer. He made his first-class debut for Sri Lanka Army Sports Club in the 2016–17 Premier League Tournament on 5 February 2017.

References

External links
 

1991 births
Living people
Sri Lankan cricketers
Sri Lanka Army Sports Club cricketers
Cricketers from Colombo